Rahm's brush-furred rat (Lophuromys rahmi) is a species of rodent in the family Muridae. It is found in Democratic Republic of the Congo, Rwanda, and Uganda. Its natural habitat is subtropical or tropical moist montane forests. It is threatened by habitat loss.

References

Lophuromys
Mammals described in 1964
Taxonomy articles created by Polbot